Eupatorina is a genus of flowering plants in the family Asteraceae.

There is only one known species, Eupatorina sophiifolia, endemic to the island of Hispaniola in the West Indies (Dominican Republic and Haiti).

References

Eupatorieae
Monotypic Asteraceae genera